General Ahsan Saleem Hayat  (born 10 January 1948), is a retired senior officer of the Pakistan Army who served as the Vice Chief of Army Staff of the Pakistan Army from 2004 until his retirement in 2007. Prior to that, he served as the operational field commander of the V Corps in Sindh Province and was a full-tenured professor of war studies at the National Defence University. He was succeeded by General Ashfaq Parvez Kayani on 8 October 2007.

Army career
He was a military brat, coming from a military family. Through his parents recommendations, he attended the PAF High School in Sargodha, Punjab. Upon graduation, he went on to attend the Pakistan Military Academy (PMA) in the 11th War Course. He was given commission as a second lieutenant in the Pakistan Army Armoured Corps in 1968 and actively participated in the Indo-Pakistani War of 1971 on the western fronts.

As a brigadier, he commanded the elite 3rd Independent Armored Brigade based in Lahore from 1991 to 1993. In 1993, he was posted as Deputy Commandant and Chief Instructor of Command and Staff College in Quetta. He also served as Director General Planning, at the Chief of Army Staff (COAS) Secretariat. He also served as the Chief Instructor of the Armed Forces War College at the then National Defence University in Islamabad before being promoted to Lieutenant General in December 2000.

Assassination attempt
Before being appointed Vice Chief, he was the commander of the V Corps at Karachi. This formation's area of operation covers almost the entire territory of the Sindh province. On 10 June 2004, he survived an assassination attempt when his convoy was attacked by militants from the terrorist outfit Jundallah. At least 11 men in his escort were martyred, but he survived.

Vice Chief of Army Staff
He was commander of the V Corps at the time of his promotion to four star general, and he replaced General Yusaf Khan as the Vice Chief of Army Staff whose term expired in October 2004. Hayat was fourth in seniority when he ascended to the post. Lieutenant Generals Hamid Javaid, Javed Hassan, and Munir Hafiez were senior to him; hence standing superseded once Hayat was promoted. His term expired in October 2007. He was replaced by General Ashfaq Parvez Kayani, who became the country's new Chief of Army Staff once General Pervez Musharraf retired from the army.

General Ahsan later became the colonel-in-chief of the Armoured Corps at the Armoured Corps Regimental Center, Nowshera on 5 May 2005, succeeding General Yusaf Khan.

Awards and decorations

Foreign decorations

Notes

Pakistani generals
1948 births
Living people
Academic staff of the National Defence University, Pakistan
Pakistan Armoured Corps officers
PAF College Sargodha alumni